Thangu Valley or Thangu-Chopta Valley is a town located in Mangan District in Sikkim, India. The population is at an estimated 1,000 residents.

Location 
Thangu valley is situated in the northern part of the Sikkim province, roughly 30 kilometers (18.6 miles) North of the larger town of Lachen. It is a common stop for tourists traveling to Gurudongmar Lake

References 

Villages in Mangan district